Calafquén Lake (Mapudungun: Lake like a sea) is a lake of Chile, which straddles the border between the La Araucanía Region and Los Ríos Region. It is one of the Seven Lakes and forms part of the drainage basin of the Valdivia River.

The Villarrica Volcano is situated in the vicinity, north of the lake.

References
 Lago Calafquén

External links

Lakes of Chile
Lakes of Araucanía Region
Lakes of Los Ríos Region
Glacial lakes of Chile